Erika Lorena Aifán (born 1975) is a former Guatemalan judge. On International Women's Day in 2021, she was awarded an award from the US Secretary of State.

Career

Aifan works with a very small staff of three and only one of those is permanent. In about 2016, she became a "high risk D" judge. During her time as a judge over 75 complaints were filed against her.

She dealt with nine businesspeople who were involved with giving bribes to disgraced minister . She ordered that they pay compensation and that they gave public apologies.

That court has ordered that these three should be given special protection. While she was dealing with the case against the politician Gustavo Alejos she received reports that two of her staff had been tampering with evidence.

She backed her staff and when the case went to the Supreme court then her staff were not punished but promoted. Aifan has won disputes like this but she has had to hire lawyers at her own expense to counter the dubious charges.

On March 21, 2022 Aifan resigned her position and fled the country for fear that corrupt government officials were about to have her arrested.

Awards and recognitions 
On International Women's Day in 2021 she was given the International Women of Courage Award from the US Secretary of State. The ceremony was virtual due to the ongoing COVID-19 pandemic and it included an address by First Lady, Dr. Jill Biden. After the award ceremony all of the fourteen awardees would be able to take part in a virtual exchange as part an International Visitor Leadership Program.

Unusually another seven women were included in the awards who had died in Afghanistan. Aifan's citation noted particularly her attacks on corruption, improving both transparency and the independence of the Guatemalan justice system.

References

1975 births
Living people
Guatemalan women judges
Recipients of the International Women of Courage Award
21st-century Guatemalan judges
21st-century women judges